Huddersfield Town's 2004–05 campaign was their first competitive campaign in the restructured Coca-Cola League One. They finished 9th with 70 points, just one point less than Hartlepool United in 6th, the lowest playoff position.

Squad at the start of the season

Review
Town beat Stockport County on the opening day, but then failed to score in their next 4 games, including a 1–0 defeat to Leeds United in the first round of the League Cup at Elland Road. The season included victories away at eventual champions Luton Town and at home over runners-up Hull City but also included two derby defeats against Bradford City. However, a disastrous mid-season spell of form (including seven successive away league defeats and having Efe Sodje stripped of the captaincy after his red card against Blackpool in the Football League Trophy) saw the side slump and in real danger of a relegation battle.

Jon Worthington was made captain after the Blackpool game, but then Huddersfield gained a recovery in form with the loan signing of Luke Beckett from Sheffield United, but he was then recalled by Sheffield in mid-February.

The team were in deep trouble in mid-March, with relegation being a big possibility, but the play-offs were still possible, although Town had to win all their final 10 games to have a realistic chance of reaching the play-offs and all was going well, until Town played Colchester United at the Galpharm Stadium. With 1 minute to go, Town were leading 2–1, but then a goalkeeping error by Paul Rachubka (signed earlier in the season from Charlton Athletic) let Colchester equalise the game. That proved to be fatal, Town did win all the other 9 games and they missed out on the play-offs by one point.

During the season, many graduates from Town's own academy started to cement first-team places, such as Andy Holdsworth, David Mirfin, Nathan Clarke, Tom Clarke, Adnan Ahmed and Michael Collins. Beckett departed to join local rivals Oldham Athletic before the transfer deadline.

Squad at the end of the season

Final league table

Results

Pre-season matches

Coca-Cola League One

FA Cup

League Cup

Football League Trophy

Appearances and goals

2004-05
2004–05 Football League One by team